Symphyllia is the generic name of two groups of organisms. It can refer to:

Symphyllia, a synonym for a genus of corals, Lobophyllia 
Symphyllia (plant), a genus of plants in the family Euphorbiaceae